Safiyar Behbudov (14 June 1967, in Barda, Azerbaijan – 21 March 1992, in Aghdam, Azerbaijan) was an Azerbaijani officer, the National Hero of Azerbaijan, and the warrior of the First Nagorno-Karabakh War.

Life 
He was born on 14 June 1967, in Mollalı village of Barda region. He went to the Barda city secondary school No. 6 in 1984, and then, he was drafted to the military service in the Soviet Army. After completing his military service, he graduated from the officer course with a rank of Lieutenant and became an active participant of the 1988 National Liberation Movement. He founded “Soy” Democratic Youth Organization in Barda and gathered young people from the town around him. A week after the Khojaly genocide, he joined Barda self-defense battalion without hesitation. After participation in several successful operations in the Terter region, his unit commander sent his troop to fight in the direction of Aghdam.

Military activities 
On March 11, 1992, Armenian soldiers suddenly attacked the positions of Azerbaijani army near Askeran and surrounded the area completely. Safiyar, who fought in battle with his PDM, successfully overthrew the resistance of the enemy and then, they moved towards Askeran.

He faced with the strong military force of the Armenians in the place called Garagha, but did not retreat. After the fight, he was severely wounded and captured by the Armenian soldiers. Even though he underwent severe tortures in the captivity,  he did not tell anything about his army's military secrets. After ten days in the captivity, he was killed by the Armenian soldiers. The Armenian side only returned his body on 21 March 1992, with the help of the Aghdam Regional Militia Department.

Memorial 
Behbudov was posthumously awarded the title of "National Hero of Azerbaijan" by the decree of the President of the Republic of Azerbaijan dated June 7, 1992, No 833.

He was buried in Mollalı village of Barda region. The secondary school No. 6 is named after him.

Sources 
Vüqar Əsgərov. "Azərbaycanın Milli Qəhrəmanları" (Yenidən işlənmiş II nəşr). Bakı: "Dərələyəz-M", 2010, səh. 53.

References 

1967 births
1992 deaths
Azerbaijani military personnel
Azerbaijani military personnel of the Nagorno-Karabakh War
Azerbaijani military personnel killed in action
National Heroes of Azerbaijan
People from Barda District